Christoph Friedrich Bretzner (10 December 1748 – 31 August 1807) was a Leipzig merchant famous for writing the libretto to a singspiel entitled Belmont und Constanze, oder Die Entführung aus dem Serail, produced in Berlin and adapted in 1782 by Wolfgang Amadeus Mozart and Gottlieb Stephanie as Die Entführung aus dem Serail.
He died on 31 August 1807 after arriving for a theatrical performance in Leipzig.

References

External link 

18th-century German businesspeople
German opera librettists
Wolfgang Amadeus Mozart's librettists
Writers from Leipzig
1748 births
1807 deaths
18th-century German writers
18th-century German male writers